Jordan Douglas Wynn (born July 5, 1990) is an American football coach and former college football quarterback. He previously served as quarterbacks coach under Norm Chow at Hawaii.

Wynn attended the University of Utah from 2009 to 2012. He began his career with arguably the best season ever by a Utah true freshman quarterback, completing 104-of-179 passes for 1,329 yards and eight touchdowns in just six games (five starts). He capped his true freshman season as the 2009 Poinsettia Bowl MVP, leading the Utes to a 37–27 victory over California.

Over the following years, Wynn was plagued by injuries, including a season-ending injury to his left (non-throwing) shoulder against Washington in game four of his junior season. He retired on September 10, 2012, after suffering his fourth shoulder injury in three years.

In November 2012, he was hired by Norm Chow as quarterbacks coach at Hawaii.

In September 2015, Wynn joined former Utah coach Dave Schramm's at Fresno State as an unpaid volunteer.

References

External links

Hawaii Rainbow Warriors bio
Utah Utes profile

1990 births
Living people
Sportspeople from Oceanside, California
American football quarterbacks
Utah Utes football players
Hawaii Rainbow Warriors football coaches
Fresno State Bulldogs football coaches
Players of American football from California